J.P. Licks is an ice cream store chain with 17 locations around Massachusetts. J.P. Licks pays homage to its hometown and location, Jamaica Plain, a  Boston neighborhood colloquially referred to as "J.P.”

Owner and founder
Vincent Petryk, owner and founder of J.P. Licks, is originally from Philadelphia. After graduating from Temple University with a degree in psychology, he worked as a dishwasher at Hillary's Homemade Ice Cream, a Philadelphia ice cream store. Although he expected the job to be short-term, he ended up becoming a scooper, then an ice cream maker, and then the manager and the head ice cream maker for Hillary's. He stated, "While at Hillary’s, I witnessed daily the power and magic of ice cream. I realized that ice cream connects you to some of the fondest memories of your childhood." Petryk then got married and moved to Jamaica Plain (or JP as it is known locally), which he would later call his "true hometown". For three years, he worked at Wendy’s fast-food hamburger chain as a manager learning professional restaurant operations, which he felt was necessary to know before starting his own business.

At age 26, in 1981, he opened J.P. Licks a few blocks from his home in Jamaica Plain (hence, the name) with business partner Michael Herbert. They each invested $25,000 to start the store, but Herbert only remained part of the company for a couple of years before Petryk bought him out. J.P. Licks quickly out grew that location (where ice cream was made in the window so customers could watch the process and moved to a larger location in JP, where Purple Cactus currently resides. In 1999, the company moved to an old fire station just across the street, and that's where the company headquarters have been ever since. One of the initial stores outside of Jamaica Plain to open was in Inman Square, Cambridge. That store no longer exists but the second non-Jamaica Plain location to open, the Coolidge Corner, Brookline location, has been a neighborhood staple since 1988. The 17th store opened in 2019 in Andover, MA.

Flavors
J.P. Licks uses ingredients that can be found in a typical home kitchen and incorporates them in different ways to create exciting flavors.  In total, J.P. Licks has over 300 recipes including lactose-free ice cream, sorbet, sherbet, low-fat yogurt and non-fat soft yogurt. J.P. Licks is known for its ambitious featured flavors that, if anything, simply draw attention for being outrageous. Examples are Cucumber, Noodle Kugel, Avocado, Disco Inferno (Tabasco flavored), Wasabi flavored, and Ube (a purple root vegetable frequently used in Filipino cuisine). The stores feature flavors that reflect the food of the season; in the Fall they integrate pumpkin and apple into their ice cream options and only make their Fresh Peach Ice Cream when actual fresh peaches can be found around the month of August, which is why so many flavors are only available one time a year and only for a few weeks at a time. These ice cream flavors resulted from extensive experimentation by Petryk himself.
J.P. Licks also partners with fellow small, local companies to invent new flavors. In 2022, they partnered with Castle Island Brewing, Co. to create "Salted Caramel Infused Coffee Ice Cream"  and with Grillo's Pickles to create "Fresh Pickle Ice Cream" for National Pickle Day, held annually on November 14.

Variety of ice cream options 
J.P. Licks sells many regular ice cream flavors as well as hard frozen yogurt, soft frozen yogurt, dairy-free ice cream, and sorbet. In 1987, J.P. Licks began producing hard and soft frozen yogurt from scratch, and now, frozen yogurt still is an important part of the store and makes up 20% of its sales. 

They also prepare a variety of stock ice cream cakes and custom made/decorated ice cream cakes for any occasion - all packed by hand!

The stores also have vegan, gluten free, and dairy free flavors, and all J.P. Licks products are Kosher certified.

In 2006, J.P. Licks released a dog-friendly ice cream called "Cow Paws" made of dairy-free peanut butter and honey sorbet (with a kosher dog bone on top!). In 2021 they tried a Smokey Maple Bacon flavor but the Peanut Butter and Honey Cow Paw are demanded in large numbers.

Coffee
In 1999, J.P. Licks began roasting its own coffee in the headquarters in Jamaica Plain, with a wide selection of fair trade organic coffee and over 20 different coffee blends. J.P. Licks supports a community in Guatemala called the Trapichitos Community that hand picks and hand sorts the coffee. The growers decide the price and are paid directly to eliminate middlemen manipulation that often comes with growing coffee. The initial decision to make coffee was made by Petryk when Starbucks bought Coffee Connection and he was unimpressed by the quality of coffee in the Boston Area. He describes his coffee as "down the middle…dark enough for a hearty brew but not so dark that every bean tastes burnt". Also, depending on the store, J.P. Licks also offers breakfast goods such as croissants, muffins, cookies, cupcakes, scones, and bagels. These are also all made in the J.P. Licks headquarters.

Community service
J.P. Licks is known to donate to local charities, organizations, and schools. Not only does it give its food for various events and donates gift cards to non-profits for auctions, but it also sets up in-store charitable incentives. It supported the Starlight foundation by giving a “J.P. Licks” dollar to anyone who donated one dollar to Starlight. It has also set up a one-day special for Veterans Day where all proceeds from one-dollar coffees went to the New England Shelter for Homeless Veterans. In 2011, it had a long-term partnership with the Home for Little Wanderers and are encouraging donations through once again offering “J.P. Licks dollars” in all their stores. In 2019, J.P. Licks started holding an annual Sock Drive every February to benefit the guests of Rosie's Place.  

J.P. Licks also has a robust artist program, displaying the work of local artists in 16 of their 17 stores. The artists display their work free of charge, with no commission taken from sales.  Some of their most notable artists include Sharif Muhammad, Ekua Holmes, who recently displayed her work at the MFA in Boston, and Robin Abrahams, otherwise known as "Miss Conduct," an advice columnist for The Boston Globe, who turned to art during the COVID-19 lockdown in 2020.

J.P. Licks partners with several Boston area arts organizations to elevate the visibility of arts in Boston as the company knows that a thriving arts community means a thriving restaurant community. Some recent partners include The Boch Center, Lyric Stage Company of Boston, and Boston Bookfest. In 2021, the only free Chess Club in Boston started using the Jamaica Plain J.P. Licks location as their Thursday evening home. It's a place where anyone of any skill level can play a match - outside in the summer, and inside in colder months - over a cup of ice cream or coffee.

Awards
J.P. Licks has received over 400 awards, ranging from major honors to small magazine recognitions. Past awards include “Best of Boston” by Boston magazine, “Best Location - Jamaica Plain” by Boston magazine, WBZ’s “A-List”, and Greater Boston Chamber of Commerce’s “Small Business of the Year”.

Locations 
While Petryk opened J.P. Licks' first store in Jamaica Plain in 1981, J.P. Licks now has 17 locations in and around Boston, and all locations are currently within 20 miles of the J.P. home base. Their latest location is in Andover.

Stores are located in:
 Andover
 Park Street
 Boston
 Boylston Street
 Charles Street
 Chestnut Hill
 Jamaica Plain
 Mission Hill
 Newbury Street
 South Bay
 South Boston
 Brookline
 Coolidge Corner
 Cambridge
 Harvard Square
 Dedham
 Legacy Place
 Lynnfield
 MarketStreet
 Newton
 Newton Centre
 Somerville
 Assembly Row
 Davis Square
 Wellesley
 Wellesley Square

References 

1981 establishments in Massachusetts
American companies established in 1981
Companies based in Boston
Ice cream brands
Jamaica Plain, Boston